William Alexander Clark Beedie (22 April 1894–1951) was a Scottish footballer who played in the Football League for Portsmouth.

References

1894 births
1951 deaths
Scottish footballers
Association football forwards
English Football League players
Clyde F.C. players
Blantyre Celtic F.C. players
Portsmouth F.C. players
Oldham Athletic A.F.C. players